Cryptovenator (Crypto, from Greek kryptos (hidden, secret); venator, from Latin (hunter)) is an extinct genus of sphenacodontid pelycosaurs which existed in Germany during the latest Carboniferous (late Gzhelian age, 300 Ma ± 2.4 Ma). It is known from the holotype LFN−PW 2008/5599−LS, an anterior right mandible fragment, recovered from a dark, fine grained sandstone of the middle Remigiusberg Formation. It was first named by Jörg Fröbisch, Rainer R. Schoch, Johannes Müller, Thomas Schindler and Dieter Schweiss in 2011 and the type species is Cryptovenator hirschbergeri.

Phylogeny 
Cladogram after Fröbisch et al., 2011:

See also

 List of pelycosaurs

References

Sphenacodontidae
Carboniferous synapsids
Prehistoric synapsid genera
Prehistoric synapsids of Europe
Fossil taxa described in 2011